Janiel Simon (born June 11, 1981) is an Antiguan footballer.

Janiel works for the Environmental division of the Antigua and Barbuda Government. He also was instrumental in organising a friendly match between a SAP F.C. side and a touring team of Explorer Scouts from the UK. The final score was:
SAP F.C. 7- 5 Gladiator ESU football team. Janiel played most of the match, despite an eye injury, in defence rather than in goal.

He played 15 games for the Spartans in 2003  and 14 games for the Lakers in 2007.

International career
Nicknamed Board, Simon made his debut for Antigua and Barbuda in an April 2000 FIFA World Cup qualification match against Bermuda and has earned over 20 caps since. He played in 8 FIFA World Cup qualification games.

National team statistics

References

External links
 Bio - Clayton State
 

1981 births
Living people
Antigua and Barbuda footballers
Antigua and Barbuda international footballers
Association football goalkeepers
Clayton State University alumni
Expatriate soccer players in the United States
SAP F.C. players
Antigua Barracuda F.C. players
USL Championship players
People from Saint Mary Parish, Antigua
USC Upstate Spartans men's soccer players
Bryant and Stratton College alumni